Glandular metaplasia is a type of metaplasia where irritated tissue converts to a glandular form.

An example occurs in the esophagus, where tissue becomes more similar to the tissue of the stomach.

Another example occurs in the urinary bladder.

See also
Intestinal metaplasia
Squamous metaplasia

Additional images

References

Histopathology